Benedykt Tadeusz Dybowski (12 May 183331 January 1930) was a Polish naturalist and physician.

Life

Benedykt Dybowski was born in Adamaryni, within the Minsk Governorate of the Russian Empire to Polish nobility. He was the brother of naturalist Władysław Dybowski and the cousin of the French explorer Jean Dybowski.

He studied at Minsk High School, and later medicine at Tartu (earlier Dorpat) University in present-day Estonia. He later studied at Wroclaw University and went on expeditions to seek and study oceanic fishes and crustaceans. He became a professor of zoology at the Warsaw main school.

In 1864 he was arrested and condemned to death for taking part in the Polish January Uprising. His sentence was later reduced to 12 years in Siberia.

He started studying the natural history of Siberia and in 1866 a governor Muraviov dismissed Dybowski from hard labour (katorga), renewed his civil rights and proposed him to work as a doctor in hospital.

He later settled in the small village Kultuk and began a detailed study of Baikal Lake with some technical support from the Russian Geographical Society. He served as a medical doctor for the indigenous population of Kamchatka, the Aleutian Islands, the Commander Islands, Bering Island, making four trips per year around the populated areas there.

After returning from Asia he continued research work at Lwów University (Lemberg). He was a president of the Polish Copernicus Society of Naturalists (1886–87).

In 1927 the Academy of Sciences in the USSR elected Dybowski as a member-correspondent. Apart from that in 1921 Dybowski was given an honorary doctorate by the Warsaw's University, and in 1923 by the University of Wilno. On Dybowski's 95th birthday he was congratulated by the Shevchenko Scientific Society government.

Dybowski spent the last years of his life in Lwów. Dybowski died at the age of 97. He is buried in Lwów (present-day Lviv) on the Łyczakowski Cemetery among the participants of the Polish Uprising of 1863.

Most of his collection of zoological and botanical specimens is now in the Lwów Zoological museum.

An amphipod (Gammaracanthuskytodermogammarus loricatobaicalensis), supposedly from Lake Baikal and named by him was once considered the longest scientific name. However, that name is no longer considered valid.

In February 2014, traveller Jacek Pałkiewicz unveiled a memorial plaque to Dybowski in Petropavlovsk-Kamchatski.

See also 
:Category:Taxa named by Benedykt Dybowski
 Christopher Szwernicki
 Paweł Edmund Strzelecki

References

External links

 Biography
 Curiosities of Biological Nomenclature: Wordplay
 The diary of Dr. Benedykt Dybowski from 1862 until 1878
 "Dybowski 1863" short movie by Maciej Pawlicki about the Dybowskis's arrest and the death penalty trial for taking part in the 1863 Polish January Uprising against the occupying Russian Empire at the Warsaw Main School while being the assistant professor there.
 1957 Polish 2.50 zloty postage stamp with Benedykt Dybowski

1833 births
1930 deaths
People from Valozhyn District
People from Vileysky Uyezd
People from the Russian Empire of Polish descent
Polish naturalists
Polish general practitioners
Explorers of Siberia
January Uprising participants
Polish exiles in the Russian Empire
Academic staff of the University of Warsaw
Members of the Lwów Scientific Society
Members of the Polish Academy of Learning
Burials at Lychakiv Cemetery